Thomas Wenman, 2nd Viscount Wenman (1596 – 25 January 1665), was an English landowner and politician who sat in the House of Commons at various times between 1621 and 1660.

Wenman was the only son of Richard Wenman, 1st Viscount Wenman, by Agnes, eldest surviving daughter of Sir George Fermor, of Easton Neston, Northamptonshire. He took part in the settlement of Ireland and was granted lands in Garrycastle in the King's County. He also sat as Member of Parliament for Brackley from 1621 to 1622 and 1624 to 1625 and for Oxfordshire in 1626, from November 1640 to 1648 and in 1660. He was appointed by the Long Parliament to be one of the commissioners to carry the propositions for peace to Charles at Oxford in 1643 and was also a commissioner for the Treaty of Uxbridge in 1645 and the Treaty of Newport in 1648. In 1645 he was granted £4 a week by Parliament for damages caused by the King's forces at his Oxfordshire estate.  

Lord Wenman married Margaret, daughter of Edmund Hampden. He died without surviving male issue in January 1665 and was succeeded by his younger brother, Philip.

References

 

1596 births
1665 deaths
Viscounts in the Peerage of Ireland
English landowners
English MPs 1621–1622
English MPs 1624–1625
English MPs 1625
English MPs 1626
English MPs 1628–1629
English MPs 1640 (April)
English MPs 1640–1648
English MPs 1660